The oleaginous hemispingus (Sphenopsis frontalis) is a species of bird in the family Thraupidae. It is found in Colombia, Ecuador, Peru, and Venezuela. Its natural habitats are subtropical or tropical moist montane forests and heavily degraded former forest.

Description
The species' underparts are dull-yellow in colour while it upperpart is olive-green.

References

oleaginous hemispingus
Birds of the Northern Andes
oleaginous hemispingus
Taxonomy articles created by Polbot